The 1965 NCAA College Division football season was the tenth season of college football in the United States organized by the National Collegiate Athletic Association at the NCAA College Division level.

Conference realignment

Membership changes

Conference standings

Rankings

College Division teams (also referred to as "small college") were ranked in polls by the AP (a panel of writers) and by UPI (coaches). The national champion(s) for each season were determined by the final poll rankings, published at or near the end of the regular season, before any bowl games were played.

College Division final polls
In 1965, both services ranked North Dakota State (10–0) first; the UPI coaches' poll had Cal State Los Angeles (8–1) second, while the AP poll had Middle Tennessee (9–0) as the number two team. North Dakota State later beat , 20–7 in the Pecan Bowl in Abilene, Texas.

Associated Press (writers) final poll
Published on November 26

Denotes team won a game after AP poll, hence record differs in UPI poll

United Press International (coaches) final poll
Published on December 5

Bowl games
The postseason consisted of four bowl games as regional finals, played on December 11.

See also
 1965 NCAA University Division football season
 1965 NAIA football season

References